Fama (minor planet designation: 408 Fama) is a typical main belt asteroid in orbit around the Sun. It was discovered by German astronomer Max Wolf on 13 October 1895 in Heidelberg.

Photometric observations at the Oakley Observatory in Terre Haute, Indiana, during 2007 were used to build a light curve for this asteroid. The asteroid displayed a rotation period of 12.19 ± 0.02 hours and a brightness variation of 0.15 ± 0.03 in magnitude.

References

External links
 
 

Background asteroids
Fama
Fama
Slow rotating minor planets
18951013